Elizabeth Lilburne (fl. 1641–1660), born Elizabeth Dewell, was a Leveller and the wife of John Lilburne.

Biography
The daughter of the London merchant Henry Dewell (d. in or after 1655), no details of Elizabeth's life prior to her marriage to John in or before September 1641 (shortly after his release from prison) are known. Already involved in London separatist circles at the time of her marriage, she was one of the thirteen women and sixteen men arrested in September 1641 for their attendance at John Spilsbury's Baptist congregation in Stepney. Her husband's politically active life, leading to frequent spells in prison (often with Elizabeth alongside him) and some time in exile, dominated her life and made for much lobbying and hardship for her. During John's time serving as a captain in Baron Brooke's regiment he was captured at the Battle of Brentford (1642) by royalists and threatened with execution. Elizabeth not only managed to petition parliament to threaten tit-for-tat executions of royalist prisoners if her husband was executed, but also carried a letter of this news from the Speaker of the House of Commons to the Royalist court in exile in Oxford whilst pregnant. After John's release she spent a few quieter months in Boston, Lincolnshire while he was serving with the army of the Eastern Association, though he became more and more disaffected with the dominant parliamentary factions. Heavily pregnant, she joined him in Newgate Prison in August 1645 when he was sent there for attacking William Lenthall and it was there that their daughter Elizabeth was born and (maybe against the couple's wishes) baptised. Elizabeth's childbed linen was in the meantime stolen from the couple's London home by parliamentary officers hunting for "dangerous Bookes". Between then and 1649 they also had two sons.

John was imprisoned again in 1646-48 for attacking Presbyterian and parliamentarian authoritarianism and in March to July 1649 - during the former period Elizabeth was herself arrested for circulating John's books, and it was her catching smallpox (as did the couple's 3 children - the two sons died but the daughter survived) that led to his bail at the end of the latter. Elizabeth recovered and went on to have seven more children, though only two of these (plus their first daughter) reached adulthood. She became ill again in October 1649 and was unable to be present on John's acquittal of treason by a London jury. The following 18 months were peaceful for the couple, living partly off the proceeds of confiscated Durham church lands John had been granted in compensation for his 1630s punishments, but they came to ruin through the exile and £7000 fine imposed on John in January 1652 after his conviction for libel by parliament after an attack on Sir Arthur Haselrig's administration of sequestered north-eastern estates. The prominent Baptist William Kiffin was an old friend of John and a former political ally, and it was to him that Elizabeth was entrusted during John's exile. She tried to convince him to reconcile himself to Oliver Cromwell, if only for their family's sake, visiting him in Bruges and convincing him to return to England in June 1653. He was, however, imprisoned on arrival and remained there until his death apart from brief paroles, though two more children were born in 1652-53 (he criticised her for being "perfectly distracted" by the death of one of their children in this period). John's father and Elizabeth tried and failed in July 1655 to have him released, with themselves as guarantors of his good behaviour, and he was moved from Jersey to Dover before dying in Eltham on 29 August 1657 on bail after his wife's last confinement.

Later years 
In his last years John became a Quaker but it seems from his writings that he was not joined in this by Elizabeth. In his exile writings he called her arguments to him to return to be "mournful", the terms on which she recommended compromise as "sneaking terms [that] my soul abhorres [sic]" and Elizabeth herself as "my poor credulous wife". However, her arguments were vindicated after his death when she eventually managed to gain from Cromwell the lifting of the 1652 fine, the renewal of a weekly pension of 40s. for herself and her children and help in settling disputes over the Durham property. Her pension was still being paid in March 1660, though the improvement in her fortunes probably ended with the English Restoration. With John's obstinacy now removed, she also managed to resolve the Lilburnes' complex property disputes in Durham, so much so that Arthur Haselrig became an ally in Parliament (in return for her giving him all the papers relating to his original dispute with John).

In popular culture
In The Devil's Whore (2008) she is played by Maxine Peake.

External links

English Baptists
Levellers
Roundheads
Women in the English Civil War
English women in politics
English activists
English women activists